Roman Veber (born February 3, 1969) is a Slovak former professional ice hockey player. He last played in the European Elite Leagues with HC 05 Banská Bystrica of the Slovak Extraliga during the 2008–09 Slovak Extraliga season.

Career statistics

References

External links

1969 births
Living people
ETC Crimmitschau players
Grizzlys Wolfsburg players
HK Dukla Trenčín players
HC Olomouc players
HC '05 Banská Bystrica players
HC Slovan Bratislava players
KLH Vajgar Jindřichův Hradec players
Ravensburg Towerstars players
Ritten Sport players
Slovak ice hockey defencemen
Ice hockey people from Bratislava
Slovak expatriate ice hockey players in the Czech Republic
Slovak expatriate ice hockey players in Germany
Naturalized citizens of Germany
Expatriate ice hockey players in Italy
Slovak expatriate sportspeople in Italy